Draghixa Laurent (born 3 June 1973), best known as Draghixa, is a French former pornographic actress and singer of Croatian origin.

Yugoslav-born, Draghixa moved to France with her family  when she was two.  After  hairdresser training she became a stripper and then debuted in the adult film industry in 1993, in the third volume of the film series Offertes à Tout. In 1995 she was awarded with the Hot d'Or for best actress, for her performance in the film Le Parfum de Mathilde (The Scent Of Mathilde).  She retired from adult industry a few months later. In 1996 with the stage name Monika Dombrowski she published the music single "Dream" and then the following year she featured the song "Did You Test?" by French DJ Lapsus. She also appeared, together with Julia Channel, in the music video of the song "Cours vite" by French rock group Silmarils.

References

External links
 Fan site
 
 Draghixa Laurent on Internet Adult Film Database
 Draghixa Laurent on Adult Film Database

1973 births
Living people
French pornographic film actresses
Yugoslav emigrants to France
French people of Croatian descent
Actors from Split, Croatia